"Annie Had a Baby" is a 1954 rhythm and blues song written by Henry Glover (co-credited to Lois Mann) and recorded by The Midnighters.  The single was one of many answer songs to "Work With Me, Annie", a previous hit for The Midnighters.  "Annie Had a Baby" was also a number one hit on the R&B chart. A credible inspiration for this song was when a Los Angeles DJ played "Work With Me, Annie" then joked about a follow-up record titled "Annie Had a Baby" which caused King Records to receive orders for the then non-existing single. So the song was composed, recorded and released to fill the orders.

References

1954 songs
Answer songs
Hank Ballard songs
The Midnighters songs
Songs written by Henry Glover
1954 singles
Songs written by Syd Nathan
Joan Baez songs
Ike & Tina Turner songs
Federal Records singles